Unique FC is a U.S. Virgin Islands soccer club based in Christiansted, U.S. Virgin Islands that competes in the St. Croix League. They were previously known as Unique and Tropical FC. Unique has never participated in the U.S. Virgin Islands Championship, but were the de facto U.S. Virgin Islands Champions in 2009–10, as no nationwide championship was held that season.

Honors 
 St. Croix Soccer League:
 Winners (2): 1998–99, 2009–10
 Runners-up (2): 1997–98, 2010–11

References 

Soccer clubs in the United States Virgin Islands